Thor Pedersen (born 14 June 1945) is former member of Folketinget. He was representing the Liberal party, Venstre. He was Finance Minister from 27 November 2001 to 23 November 2007 as part of the Cabinets of Anders Fogh Rasmussen I and II. He was a Member of Parliament (Folketinget) from 1985 to 2011 and served as Speaker from 28 November 2007 until 15 September 2011.

He was Minister of Housing from 12 March 1986 to 9 September 1987, Minister of the Interior from 10 September 1987 to 25 January 1993, Minister for Nordic Cooperation from 3 June 1988 to 18 November 1992 and Minister of Economic Affairs from 19 November 1992 to 25 January 1993.

He was a member of Helsinge Municipal Council from 1974 to 1986, where he was also mayor from  1978 to 1986.

Education 

Matriculated in mathematics, Frederiksborg State Upper Secondary School, 1964

Sergeant in the Royal Danish Life Guards, 1964–1966

Master of Science in Economics, University of Copenhagen, 1978

Other work  
Thor Pedersen has worked extensively in private business, both in investment companies and as a board member of several Danish companies.

References
 

1945 births
Living people
Danish Finance Ministers
Danish Interior Ministers
Mayors of places in Denmark
University of Copenhagen alumni
Speakers of the Folketing
Venstre (Denmark) politicians
People from Gribskov Municipality
Members of the Folketing 1984–1987
Members of the Folketing 1987–1988
Members of the Folketing 1988–1990
Members of the Folketing 1990–1994
Members of the Folketing 1994–1998
Members of the Folketing 1998–2001
Members of the Folketing 2001–2005
Members of the Folketing 2005–2007
Members of the Folketing 2007–2011